WNYX may refer to:

 WNYX-LD, a low-power television station (channel 5, virtual 32) licensed to serve New York, New York
 WNYX, the fictional radio station (585 AM) setting for the television series NewsRadio
 WJZZ (FM), a radio station (88.1 FM) licensed to serve Montgomery, New York, which held the call sign WNYX from 2009 to 2014